VistaJet is a global business aviation company founded in 2004 by Thomas Flohr. The firm flies between any two points, under a "pay for hours flown" fare structure.

As of January 2023, its fleet consists of over 360 privately-owned, mid-to-large-cabin, ultra-long-range Bombardier Global and Challenger business jets. As of 2018, it had flown to 187 countries, 1900 airports and served 367,000+ passengers. Its headquarters are in Malta, with further offices in London, New York, Los Angeles, Hong Kong and Dubai.

VistaJet has a European Aircraft Operating Certificate (AOC) in Malta. It partners with local operators in countries where airlines are obliged to fly domestically and cannot be the majority owner of an AOC, e.g., the US, where VistaJet-owned and U.S.-registered aircraft are operated by licensed U.S. direct air carriers.

History 
VistaJet was originally named Air Executive when Flohr founded the business in 2004. Its then-headquarters were in Switzerland, with operations in Austria.

2003-2005 
In 2003 Flohr bought a plane for his own use. He was able to buy this plane and subsequent planes at discounted rates, as sales for private jets had severely weakened post-9/11, a development which Flohr has since attributed as key to the subsequent growth of the business, along with expansion in Eastern European markets and a favourable dollar/euro exchange rate.

In 2004 Flohr placed his plane with a small local operator. It was chartered out within two months, making it self-financing; this prompted Flohr to buy a second, bigger plane, which was flying 100 hours per month within three months of purchase.

Flohr's interest in private aviation led him to commission a financial analysis of the industry. This study suggested a single global brand was absent; it also indicated that many private jets for hire were owner-operated, available for hire only when not in use by the owner. To offer "not-subject-to-owner-availability" flights, Flohr departed from the aviation industry norm of home bases, where privately owned charter planes must return to a fixed location to be at their owner's disposal. By dispensing with home bases, a jet could pick up a client from whichever airport was closest to the client's location.

Flohr formally launched a three-plane fleet in 2005, with flights across the European Union and CIS region.

2006-2009 
In 2008 the firm acquired Bombardier Skyjet International, effectively assuming control of the aircraft manufacturer's executive aircraft charter program, at the same time placing a US$1.2 billion order for 35 Bombardier business jets. It was reported to be Bombardier Business Aircraft's largest-ever single order. The deal included taking over Skyjet's bases in Farnborough, Dubai and Hong Kong, and made VistaJet the second-largest private jet company outside America. During this period the firm entered private aviation markets in Africa, Asia-Pacific and the Middle East It also re-designed its marketing and aircraft cabins to position itself as a branded luxury good. By 2009 the firm was operating a fleet of 23 jets.

2010-2016 
In 2012, VistaJet ordered 142 Bombardier Global 5000, 6000, 7000, and 8000 aircraft, potentially to a value of $7.8 billion. In 2013, VistaJet placed a further order 20 Bombardier Challenger aircraft, with options for another 20, in a deal worth around $518 million.

The firm expanded its service to America in 2013 via a partnership with Jet Aviation Flight Services, who initially operated a fleet of Bombardier Global aircraft on VistaJet's behalf. The move saw VistaJet's targeting former and current fractional ownership customers in the US, as well as full aircraft owners.

By 2014 VistaJet had flown over 150,000 passengers and opened a representative office in New York. In 2015, VistaJet expanded the US fleet available to customers to include the Challenger 350 aircraft, then operated by Priester Aviation. In the same year it sold its final remaining LearJet 60, ending the company's association with light jets, and began to exclusively operate Bombardier Challenger and Global aircraft. VistaJet became the first international operator permitted to offer domestic flights in China. In the same year the company co-published a book with Assouline, titled The Art of Flying.

In March 2016, VistaJet moved its corporate headquarters to Malta and took delivery of its 50th Maltese registered aircraft. The company announced adding its 70th aircraft to the fleet in October 2016. The fleet now stands at 77 aircraft.

2017-2018 

In 2017 the firm expanded its U.S. based fleet by 50%. In March 2017 the company completed its 100,000th flight. In May VistaJet abolished positioning fees.

In August 2017 VistaJet announced a $150m investment by funds affiliated to Rhône Capital. Together with secondary acquisitions, Rhône will have a $200 million stake in VistaJet, valuing VistaJet's at $2.5 billion+. The company is one of the top five European startups by funding.

In November 2017 VistaJet announced a worldwide partnership with Christie's to sponsor the exhibition and tour of The Collection of Peggy and David Rockefeller,  dedicated to raising funds for philanthropic causes. The tour took highlights of the Rockefellers collection to Hong Kong, London, Paris, Beijing, Los Angeles, Shanghai, ending in New York with the auction.

In September 2018, Vista Global, the holding company of VistaJet, announced it had acquired the fleet and commercial operations of the U.S.-based charter operator and broker XOJET

2019
In April 2019, Vista Global announced it had purchased JetSmarter, a digital broker with a membership program enabling customers to book single seats on private jet flights. XOJET Aviation LLC will be the operator for VistaJet US Inc registered aircraft.

2020-2022
During the 2019-2020 COVID-19 pandemic, VistaJet offered complimentary empty leg flights for Governments and medical transportation. It also took delivery of its first Bombardier Global 7500 aircraft. In 2021 the firm added a further four 7500s and sold more than 8,000 new annual subscription hours, up 67% year-on-year. It also acquired light jets and aircraft management services, via its purchase of Red Wing Aviation, Apollo Jet, and Talon Air.

In March 2022 VistaJet added their 10th Global 7500 to the fleet, making them the largest operator of the Global 7500 aircraft in the world.

By the end of 2022 VistaJet's fleet of Global 7500 had grown to 18 aircraft.

Business model
VistaJet's business model was designed in opposition to fractional jet ownership, where usage prices tend to be lower but the overall cost of ownership is potentially greater.

VistaJet's business model sees it flying to destinations on demand rather than as part of a scheduled route, known as a "go-anywhere any-time". The jets are owned by the company and are hired out to clients at an hourly rate rather than leased.

VistaJet operates two passenger service offerings, named Program and Direct. The Program is a multi-year subscription with committed payments securing guaranteed availability, marketed as an alternative to business jet ownership. Direct sees customers requesting flights directly. It also grants access to preferential rates on empty legs and one-way flights, based on aircraft availability. VistaJet app launched in summer 2017. The firm is an official supplier to Scuderia Ferrari.

Fleet 

VistaJet operates Bombardier business jets. VistaJet has the largest Bombardier super-mid to large 
business jet fleet in the industry. Its current fleet includes:

 Bombardier Global 7500
 Bombardier Global 6000
 Bombardier Global 5000
 Bombardier Challenger 850
 Bombardier Challenger 605
 Bombardier Challenger 350

VistaJet is reportedly Bombardier's single largest customer. In 2012 VistaJet placed US$7.8 billion in both firm and option orders for 142 Bombardier Global business jets.

In 2013, VistaJet placed a firm order for 20 Challenger 350 jets and options for an additional 20 Challenger 350 jets, worth US$1.035 billion. In 2016 the fleet doubled to over 70 Challenger and Global aircraft.

The firm has commissioned artists for nose art projects. In 2011 the street artist Retna was commissioned to graffiti the tail of a Bombardier Global Express XRS, and in 2013 an Ian Davenport design was commissioned by VistaJet and Fabergé for the tail of a VistaJet Bombardier Global 6000. The Davenport art piece coincided with a promotional campaign that saw Fabergé eggs offered to VistaJet clients as an in-flight jewelry purchase.

See also
Fractional ownership of aircraft
AirSprint
Flexjet
NetJets
PlaneSense
Wheels Up

References

External links
 

Airlines established in 2004
Airlines of Austria
Airlines of Malta
Charter airlines